The South Jasper Ranges are mountain ranges of the Rocky Mountains in Alberta and British Columbia, Canada.

It is a part of the Central Main Ranges of the Canadian Rockies, located on the Continental Divide, in Jasper National Park (Alberta) and Mount Robson Provincial Park (British Columbia). It contains the Meadow-Clairvaux, Fraser-Rampart, Trident Range and, most prominently, the Cavell Group of mountains and the headwaters of the Athabasca and Fraser River.

The South Jasper Ranges covers a surface of 1,196 km2 (462 mi2), has a length of 39 km (from north to south) and a width of 49 km.

Peaks and mountains
Mount Edith Cavell - 
Simon Peak - 
Throne Mountain - 
Manx Peak - 
Blackhorn Peak - 
Roche Noire - 
Chevron Mountain - 
Terminal Mountain - 
Lectern Peak - 
Peveril Peak - 
Muhigan Mountain - 
Marmot Mountain - 
The Whistlers - 
Tonquin Hill -

References

Ranges of the Canadian Rockies
Mountain ranges of Alberta
Mountain ranges of British Columbia